Balod is a town in banks of river Tandula and a nagar palika in Balod district in the state of Chhattisgarh, India. Balod is 44 km from Dhamtari and 58 km from Durg. Balod has
one college, one court, one CHC ( Community Health Center ), and a jail. Medical facilities are good in Balod.  There are two Dams nearby Tandula and Aadmabaad built on rivers sukha and tandula in 1912. On 1 January 2012 it was notified as Civil District though revenue district was declared from 10 January 2012. Balod became the 27th district of Chhattishgarh.There are several religious temples nearby town, particularly Ganga Maiyya temple and Siyadevi temple hold great religious value for the townsfolk.

 the district collector of Balod is Shri Saransh Mittar.

Geography
It has an average elevation of 324 metres (1063 feet).

Demographics
 India census, Balod had a population of 21,044. Males constitute 51% of the population and females 49%. Balod has an average literacy rate of 73%, higher than the national average of 59.5%; with 56% of the males and 44% of females literate. 13% of the population is under 6 years of age.

References

Cities and towns in Balod district